Elina Labourdette (1919–2014) was a French film actress.

Filmography

References

Bibliography
 Keith Reader. Robert Bresson. Manchester University Press, 2000.

External links

1919 births
2014 deaths
French film actresses
Actresses from Paris